Homoranthus elusus is a plant in the myrtle family Myrtaceae and is endemic to a small area on the Northern Tablelands of New South Wales. It is an shrub with linear leaves and with groups of up to four flowers in leaf axils. It is only known from a single specimen collected near Tenterfield.

Description
An erect shrub with 2-4 flowers held erect in leaf axils at branchlet apex. Flowers in July and August.

Taxonomy and naming
Homoranthus elusus was first formally described in 2011 by Lachlan Copeland, Lyndley Craven and Jeremy Bruhl from a specimen collected on Bluff Rock near Tenterfield in 2002 and the description was published in Australian Systematic Botany. The specific epithet (elusus) is a Latin word meaning "avoid", "evade", "frustrate" or "baffle", referring to the unsuccessful attempts by the authors to locate the species.

Distribution and habitat
Known from a single collection from Bluff Rock south of Tenterfield New South Wales. May grow in scrub and heath patches.

Conservation status
Known from a single specimen collected in 1992. Briggs and Leigh (1996) conservation code 1E.   IUCN (2010) should be considered 'Critically Endangered'.

References

External links
 The Australasian Virtual Herbarium – Occurrence data for Homoranthus elusus

Flora of New South Wales
Myrtales of Australia
elusus
Plants described in 2011